Nitilsukh is a rural locality (a selo) in Saniortinsky Selsoviet, Tlyaratinsky District, Republic of Dagestan, Russia. The population was 256 as of 2010.

Geography 
Nitilsukh is located 16 km southeast of Tlyarata (the district's administrative centre) by road. Saniorta and Rosnob are the nearest rural localities.

References 

Rural localities in Tlyaratinsky District